Maurits Kjaergaard (born 26 June 2003) is a Danish professional footballer who plays as a midfielder for Austrian Bundesliga club FC Red Bull Salzburg.

Club career
In February 2021, he made his debut for Red Bull Salzburg. On 8 March 2022, he scored his first Champions League goal in a 7–1 away defeat to Bayern Munich in the 2021–22 season round of 16.

Career statistics

Notes

Honours
Red Bull Salzburg 
Austrian Bundesliga: 2020–21, 2021-22
Austrian Cup: 2020–21, 2021-22

References

External links 

Living people
2003 births 
Danish men's footballers
Danish expatriate men's footballers
Denmark youth international footballers
Denmark under-21 international footballers
2. Liga (Austria) players
Lyngby Boldklub players
FC Red Bull Salzburg players
Association football midfielders
Danish expatriate sportspeople in Austria
Expatriate footballers in Austria